Jonas Collett (25 March 1772 – 3 January 1851) was a Danish-Norwegian public official, legislator, and statesman. Born on the Rønnebæksholm estate at Næstved in Denmark, he remained in Norway after the termination of the personal union with Denmark in 1814. He was the First minister of Norway (1822-1836).

Background
Collett was born at the family manor house Rønnebæksholm (Rønnebæksholm Gods) in Næstved, Denmark. He was the son of Johan Collett (1734-1806) and Maureen Elisabeth Jensen (1746-1788). He was educated at the University of Copenhagen and graduated in 1791. Educated in the  law,  he soon entered public service. In 1795, he was appointed Bailiff in Numedal  and later Kongsberg year.  He replaced Herman Wedel Jarlsberg as acting County Governor of Buskerud in 1813 and was succeeded by his brother Johan Collett in 1814.

Political career
Collett was a Member of Norwegian Parliament  in 1814, 1818, 1824 and 1827. He played an important role in the events of Norway in 1814 and became known as one of the "Eidsvoll men". Together with Niels Aall, he led the negotiations with Swedish general Magnus Björnstjerna which resulted in the Convention of Moss.  Later, he participated in several government positions. He was a prominent minister  and received the post of First minister  when the former First minister Mathias Sommerhielm left Christiania in 1822. His position made him the most prominent minister, although with political power than that of the Governor of Norway. When governor Baltzar von Platen died in 1829, no new governor was appointed, and Collett subsequently became the highest authority in Norway until he left office in 1836, except for a brief period in 1833 when Crown Prince Oscar was appointed viceroy.

Personal life
He was married in 1797 to Maren Christine  Collett (1777-1860), daughter of landowner  Peter Collett (1740-1786) and his second wife Johanne Henriche Ancher (1750-1812). He died  in Christiania (now Oslo) and was buried at Vår Frelsers gravlund.

References

External links 
 The family tree of Jonas Collett on Geni.com

1772 births
1851 deaths
19th-century Norwegian politicians
Jonas
Ministers of Finance of Norway
University of Copenhagen alumni
Norwegian people of English descent
People from Næstved Municipality
Danish emigrants to Norway
Ministers of Education of Norway
Defence ministers of Norway